Roland Giberti, born in Gémenos (Bouches-du-Rhône department, Provence-Alpes-Côte-d'Azur region)) in 1951, is a French politician belonging to the Nouveau Centre party.

Trained as a mathematics' teacher, he was elected mayor of Gémenos in 2001, after having served eighteen years (since 1983) as a member of the city council. He was elected representative in the general council (Conseil général) of the Bouches-du-Rhône department in 2004 for the canton of Aubagne-Est. He is also vice-president of the Urban Community of Marseille Provence Métropole.

Notes and references

French politicians
1951 births
Living people